Michael Marcio Valenzuela (born 19 February 1980) is a Paraguayan former footballer who last played for Deportivo Capiatá.

Valenzuela played in the Primera División de Chile with Palestino during 2007.

References

External links
 
 

1980 births
Living people
Paraguayan footballers
Paraguayan expatriate footballers
Club Sol de América footballers
Sportivo Carapeguá footballers
Deportivo Capiatá players
Club Olimpia footballers
Club Tacuary footballers
Club Deportivo Palestino footballers
Shenzhen F.C. players
Chinese Super League players
Chilean Primera División players
Expatriate footballers in Chile
Expatriate footballers in China
Association football defenders